Rosenska Pokalen 1900, part of the 1900 Swedish football season, was the second Rosenska Pokalen tournament played. Seven teams participated and six matches were played, the first 29 August 1900 and the last 2 September 1900. Gefle IF won the tournament ahead of runners-up AIK.

Participating clubs

Tournament results 
1st round

2nd round

3rd round

4th round

Semi-final

Final

Notes

References 

Print

1900
Rosenska Pokalen